Tkrzw is a library of routines for managing key-value databases. Tokyo Cabinet was sponsored by the Japanese social networking site Mixi, and was a multithreaded embedded database manager and was announced by its authors as "a modern implementation of DBM". Kyoto Cabinet is the designated successor of Tokyo Cabinet, while Tkrzw is a recommended successor of Kyoto Cabinet.

Tokyo Cabinet features on-disk B+ trees and hash tables for key-value storage, with "some" support for transactions.

See also

 Berkeley DB
 LevelDB

References

External links
 
 Kyoto Cabinet official website
 Kyoto Cabinet (Website Carnegie Mellon Database Group)
 Tokyo Cabinet official website
 Tokyo Cabinet (Website Carnegie Mellon Database Group)

C++ libraries
Free software programmed in C++
Database engines
Embedded databases
Key-value databases